Ba Dun (born 16 September 1995) is a Chinese professional footballer who currently plays for Chinese Super League club Tianjin Jinmen Tiger.

Club career
Ba Dun started his professional football career in 2014 when he was promoted to Chinese Super League side Beijing Guoan's first team squad. He was loaned to China League Two side Meizhou Hakka for Half season in July 2015. Meizhou Hakka extended his loan deal for another season in January 2016 after they won promotion to China League One. He played just five league match in the 2016 season due to injury.

Ba returned to Beijing Guoan's first team in the 2017 season, which newly required at least one Under-23 player must be in the starting line-up. He gained the starter from Tang Shi after manager José González was sacked by the club. On 18 June 2017, he made his Super League debut in a 2–0 home win over Tianjin TEDA, assisting Renato Augusto's goal in the 60th minute. He scored his first goal for Beijing Guoan on 5 August 2017, in a 2–2 home draw against Shandong Luneng Taishan. Ba was a regular starter under caretaker manager Xie Feng and then Roger Schmidt. At the end of the 2017 season, he went on to make 17 appearances and scoring once in the Chinese Super League.

On 22 January 2022, Ba transferred to Chinese Super League club Tianjin Jinmen Tiger.

International career
On 16 November 2021, Ba made his international debut in a 1-1 draw against Australia in the 2022 FIFA World Cup qualification.

Career statistics
.

International statistics

References

External links
 

1995 births
Living people
Chinese footballers
China international footballers
Sportspeople from Yantai
Footballers from Shandong
Beijing Guoan F.C. players
Meizhou Hakka F.C. players
Tianjin Jinmen Tiger F.C. players
Chinese Super League players
China League One players
China League Two players
Association football midfielders
21st-century Chinese people